Rani Bagh may refer to:

Rani Bagh, Delhi in India
Rani Bagh, Hyderabad in Pakistan
Victoria Gardens, or Jijamata Udyaan in Bombay, India